Zorya may refer to:

 Zorya, personification of dawn in Slavic mythology
 Zorya (album), a release by the Canadian-Ukrainian singer-songwriter Luba
 FC Zorya Luhansk, Ukrainian football club
 Zorya, a village near Sarata, Odessa Oblast, Ukraine

See also 
 Zoria, a village in Donetsk Oblast, Ukraine
 Zarya (disambiguation)